Pamela Shepherd born Pamela Morgan known as Mother Shepherd (19 March 1836 – 24 February 1930) was a Welsh evangelist for the Salvation Army notably in Aberdare.

Life
Shepherd was born in Talywain in 1836. Her parents were Margaret (born Evans) and Benjamin Morgan and she was the first of their four children. Her father was a blacksmith and a Chartist and her mother was a Baptist from Cardiganshire. In 1845 the family moved to London as her father hoped to work for the Great Western Railway and besides he was finding it hard to find work given his political outlook. The family's finances had to depend on her mother, taking in washing, after her father took to drinking. 

In 1860 she married a carter named William Shepherd and the two of them remained in London after the rest of her family returned to Wales the following year. Her husband's family helped financially and she worked as a rag sorter and as a laundress to support her daughters - although she had also taken to drink.

She was recruited by the Salvation Army in 1867 after she heard James Dowdle preach. He was known as "the Saved Railway Guard" and she was soon known as the "Hallelujah Washerwoman" as she witnessed and preached around London. In 1868 she was helping at William and Catherine Booth house and in the following year at the "Limehouse centre". This was an old music-hall that the mission had converted. No longer the "Hallelujah Washerwoman" she was called "Mother Shepherd". 

In 1878, "Mother Shepherd" was sent to Aberdare by the Salvation Army at the start of a period of growth for their mission. She was a native Welsh speaker which helped as she stood on street corners to preach on Fridays and Saturdays. The audience were mostly ironworkers and miners visiting the local taverns. After five years she had created seven new stations before she was recalled to London. Shepherd would return to Aberdare working for the community.

Shepherd admitted that she could read but she had never learned to write. She served as one of the areas probation officers when they were first introduced. She offered rooms where she lived taking in homeless girls.

Death and legacy

Shepherd died in Aberdare in 1930. She was given a public funeral with the local police acting as pall-bearers and leading ministers conducting the funeral service.

Her contribution is remembered in the local Cynon Valley museum.

References

1836 births
1930 deaths
Welsh-speaking clergy
Probation and parole officers
People from Monmouthshire